Connecticut's 23rd House of Representatives district elects one member of the Connecticut House of Representatives. It consists of the towns of Lyme, Old Lyme, Old Saybrook, and part of Westbrook. It has been represented by Republican Devin Carney since 2015.

Recent elections

2020

2018

2016

2014

2012

References

23